Jutta Bauer (born 9 January 1955) is a German writer and illustrator of children's books. For her "lasting contribution" as a children's illustrator she received the Hans Christian Andersen Medal in 2010.

Life

Born in Volksdorf, Hamburg, she studied at the Technical College of Design in Hamburg from 1975 to 1981 Afterward she worked as a children's book illustrator and as cartoonist for the women's magazine Brigitte.

She won the Deutscher Jugendliteraturpreis (German Youth Literature Award) in 2001 for the picture book Schreimutter, which she wrote and illustrated. She was a runner-up in 2002 for Opas Engel and she received a Special prize for Illustration in 2009.

The biennial Hans Christian Andersen Award conferred by the International Board on Books for Young People is the highest recognition available to a writer or illustrator of children's books. Bauer received the illustration award in 2010.

She currently resides in Hamburg.

Selected works
 Ein Engel trägt meinen Hinkelstein
 Schreimutter — 2001 Deutscher Jugendliteraturpreis, Picture books
 Opas Engel; transl. Grandpa's Angel (Walker Books)  
 Die Königin der Farben
 Abends, wenn ich schlafen geh 
 Ich sitze hier im Abendlicht
2006 – Selma, 52pp., 
2018 – Selma New Edition, 42pp.,

References

External links

  at Walker Books 
 
 Short biography from the Berlin International Literature Festival

1955 births
Living people
German children's book illustrators
German children's writers
German women novelists
German illustrators
Writers from Hamburg
Hans Christian Andersen Award for Illustration winners
German women illustrators
German women children's writers
Women science fiction and fantasy writers
20th-century German women writers
20th-century German writers
21st-century German women writers